Muncho Lake is a lake in northern British Columbia, Canada.

Geography
The lake is part of the Muncho Lake Provincial Park and located at kilometre 681 (mile ) of the Alaska Highway. It is formed along the Trout River, a tributary of the Liard River.

The jade green color of the lake is attributed to the presence of copper oxide leached from the  bedrock underneath. Its name is derived from the Kaska language in which "muncho" translates as "big water".

The small community of Muncho Lake is established on the lake's southern shore, at the confluence of Trout River and Muncho Creek. The Muncho Lake/Mile 462 Water Aerodrome is set up along the eastern shore of the lake, at Mile 462 of the Alaska Highway.

See also
Muncho Pass
Sentinel Range (Canada)

References

External links

Official brochure for the Muncho Lake Provincial Park (pdf)

Lakes of British Columbia
Northern Interior of British Columbia
Peace River Land District